The 1989 Virginia Slims of Kansas was a women's tennis tournament played on indoor hard courts at the Crestview Country Club in Wichita, Kansas in the United States and was part of  the Category 2 tier of the 1989 WTA Tour. The tournament ran from February 20 through February 26, 1989. Sixth-seeded Amy Frazier won the singles title and earned $17,000 first-prize money.

Finals

Singles

 Amy Frazier defeated  Barbara Potter 4–6, 6–4, 6–0
 It was Frazier's only title of the year and the 1st of her career.

Doubles

 Manon Bollegraf /  Lise Gregory defeated  Sandy Collins /  Leila Meskhi 6–2, 7–6(7–5)
 It was Bollegraf's 1st title of the year and the 2nd of her career. It was Gregory's only title of the year and the 3rd of her career.

Prize money

References

External links
 ITF tournament edition details
 Tournament draws
 Tournament flyer

Virginia Slims of Kansas
Virginia Slims of Kansas
Virgin
Virgin
Virginia Slims of Kansas